"Feels So Good" is Xscape's first single from their second studio album "Off the Hook". Kandi and LaTocha sing lead on the song. The song reached No. 32 on the Billboard Hot 100 and No. 8 on Billboard's Hot R&B/Hip-Hop Singles & Tracks. It also charted in the United Kingdom at No. 34, and in New Zealand at No. 24.

Charts

Weekly charts

Year-end charts

Certifications

References

1995 singles
Xscape (group) songs
Song recordings produced by Jermaine Dupri
Songs written by Jermaine Dupri
Songs written by Kandi Burruss
1994 songs